Borshchiv Ghetto was a Jewish ghetto established and operated by Nazi Germany in the Ukrainian town of Borshchiv in April 1942.

Ghetto history 
The ghetto was formed in Borshchiv on 1 April 1942 and operated until July 1943. The number of inhabitants was about 4,000 people. At first there was no fence around it, but the Jewish inhabitants were not allowed to go outside. The occupants came from Borshchiv and Ozeriany, Melnytsia-Podilska, Skala-Podilska, Kryvche, Korolivka, partly Chortkiv and Zolochiv.

On 26 September 1942 about 100 prisoners, mostly old and sick, were shot on the square, and about 800 were sent to Bełżec. A group of youth was sent to Yaniv concentration camp in Lviv .

On 13 March 1943 other 400 people were sent to Bełżec. 
On 19 April 1943 German and Ukrainian police shot about 800 people in a Jewish cemetery (in the outskirts of town, on the road to the village Verhnyakivtsi). On 5 June another 700 people were executed at the cemetery. 
From 9 to 14 June 1943, an additional 1,800 ghetto prisoners were killed. 
Then the Nazis considered Borschiv "Judenfrei" ("free of Jews").

Some Jews, however, were hiding in various recesses both in the ghetto and in other places. So occupation authorities announced that those who come out by themselves would not be destroyed, and would be in a labor camp. About 360 people believed them, but they were executed on 14 August.

Several Jewish physicians from the ghetto were saved by UPA, where they helped in the fight against the Nazis. In 1943 doctor Tayblis from a village Korolivka and doctor Monya Helyar from the village Turylche were rescued.

Some people succeeded in hiding until the end of the war. For example, Saul and Esther Stermer, their six children, and several other Jewish families from Korolivka hid in a cave Verteba near the village Bilche Zolote. When raids intensified and two of the escapees were killed, they went into hiding to the cave of Priest's Grotto. The 38 people had been hiding there for 511 days. Local farmers helped the Jews by bringing them food and reporting some news. For example, one farmer gave them a wain of barley.  The fugitives grounded the barley, and thus were able to feed themselves. In 1993, a police officer from New York, and an amateur caver found the remains of their settlement in the Priest's Grotto cave.

Some children who escaped death, secretly lived with families of peasants. Many residents of Borshchiv Raion were awarded the title "Righteous Among the Nations".

Commemoration 

In Borshchiv at the site of the destroyed Jewish cemetery during the Soviet occupation a sports complex was built. In 1990, after Ukraine gained independence, part of the stadium was reserved for the construction of the monument. It was finally established in 2011.

Borshchiv Holocaust in culture 
In April 2005, Reader's Digest published an article by Peter Lane Taylor's "Underground" about Zaid Shtermer and others left in caves.

American documentary filmmaker Janet Tobias in her film No Place on Earth described the life of Jews who were hiding in the Verteba and Priest's Grotto caves. Staged scenes, however, were not filmed in Ukraine, but in Hungary, in a similar cave. Filming in Priest's Grotto would require much time and money. Esther Stermer, her children and grandchildren in the movie were played by Hungarian actors.

See also 
 Jewish–Ukrainian relations in Eastern Galicia

References

External links
 

Holocaust locations in Ukraine
Ternopil Oblast
Ghettos in Nazi-occupied Europe
Ukrainian Insurgent Army